Bundelkhand University is a State university based in Jhansi, Uttar Pradesh, India. Founded in 1975, it has professional, technical and vocational study programmes along with facilities for research.

Administration

The chancellor of the university is the Governor of Uttar Pradesh. The vice-chancellor is Mukesh Pandey. The Statutory bodies are the court, the executive council, the academic council and the finance committee.

Campus

The main campus is located in Jhansi, Uttar Pradesh with national and international students. University mainly has the attraction for its medical science courses.

Ranking

Academic departments

Faculty of Architecture
Institute of Architecture & Town Planning
Faculty of Science
Institute of Basic Sciences 
Institute of Physical Sciences
J.C Bose Institute of Life Science
Department of Bio-Technology
Department of Micro-Biology
Department of Ecotechnology.
Institute of earth sciences.
Institute of Engineering & Technology.
Institute of Dr Atal Bihari Vajpayee food science & technology.
Institute of Dr A P J Abdul Kalam forensic science.
Institute of Technical Education
Institute of Mathematical Sciences & Computer Applications.
Institute of Computer Science & Information Technology 
Faculty of Agriculture
Institute of Agricultural Sciences
Faculty of Arts & Humanities
Institute of Economics & Finance Management
Dr. Ranganathan Institute of Library & Information Science
Dr. B R Ambedkar Institute of Social Sciences
Institute of Languages
Bhaskar Institute of Mass Communication and Journalism
Institute of Music & Fine Arts
Faculty of Commerce
Institute of Health Management
Institute of Management Studies
Institute of Tourism & Hotel Management
Faculty of Education
Major Dhyan Chand Institute of Physical Education
Institute of Education & Teaching
Institute of Professional Studies
Faculty of Law
Babu Jagjivan Ram Institute of Law
Faculty of Medicine
Institute of Biomedical Sciences
Maharani Laxmi Bai Medical College
Institute of Ayurveda
Institute of Pharmacy

Facilities 

Following are the few facilities are given to a student on the university campus:

 Auditorium and Conference Halls
 Bank
 Bundelkhand University International Centre
 Central Library
 Computer Center
 Primary Health Center
 Post Office
 University Guest House

Residential student hostels

 Dr BJR Samta PG Boys Hostel 
 Lord Buddha Boys hostel
 New Boys Hostel
 Jhalkaribai Girls Hostel
 Samta Girls Host
 P.G Girls Hostel
 O.B.C Girls Hostel

Notable alumni

 Chirag Paswan, MP & President of Lok Janshakti Party (dropout)
 Bhanu Pratap Singh Verma, MP
 Kunwar Pushpendra Singh Chandel, MP
 Anurag Sharma, MP
 Chandrapal Singh Yadav, MP
 Vishambhar Prasad Nishad, MP
 Amitabh Bajpai, MLA (Uttar Pradesh Assembly)
 Alka Lamba, ex-MLA (Delhi Assembly)

References

External links
 

Universities in Uttar Pradesh
Education in Jhansi
1975 establishments in Uttar Pradesh
Educational institutions established in 1975
Bundelkhand
Bundelkhand University